Ice Loves Coco is an American reality television series that debuted on E! in the United States and Canada on June 12, 2011. The series chronicles the daily lives of rapper and actor Ice-T and wife Coco Austin. In September 2011, it was announced by Coco that a second season had been commissioned, and filming began in October 2011, with the second season premiering on February 19, 2012. The third season of the series premiered on October 28, 2012.

Ice-T announced via his podcast on February 4, 2014, that Ice Loves Coco had been canceled due to the couple working on a possible talk show. The talk show, which would be known as Ice & Coco, ran for a three week test run in August 2015 with no further pickup.

Episodes

Season 1 (2011)

Season 2 (2012)

Season 3 (2012–13)

References

External links
 
 

2010s American reality television series
2011 American television series debuts
2013 American television series endings
African-American reality television series
English-language television shows
Television series based on singers and musicians
E! original programming
Ice-T